Barrett is an unincorporated community in Robb Township, Posey County, in the U.S. state of Indiana.

History
The post office Barrett once contained was called Kilroy. This post office was established in 1895, and remained in operation until 1906.

Geography

References

Unincorporated communities in Posey County, Indiana
Unincorporated communities in Indiana